Sindanglaya is a town in West Java, Indonesia between Bogor and Cianjur.

Populated places in West Java